Colonel John Worthy Chaplin,  (23 July 1840 – 18 August 1920) was a British Army officer and an English recipient of the Victoria Cross, the highest award for gallantry in the face of the enemy that can be awarded to British and Commonwealth forces.

Details
Chaplin was 20 years old, and an ensign in the 67th Regiment of Foot, British Army during the Second China War when the following deed took place for which he was awarded the VC.

On 21 August 1860 at the Taku Forts, China, Ensign Chaplin was carrying the Queen's Colours of the Regiment and first planted the Colours on the breach made by the storming party, assisted by a private. He then planted the Colours on the bastion of the fort which he was the first to mount, but in doing so he was severely wounded.

He achieved the rank of colonel. Chaplin was a member of Boodle's club in St James's, London, from 1880 until death.

The medal
His Victoria Cross is displayed at The Royal Hampshire Regiment Museum and Memorial Garden in Winchester, England.

References

External links
 Location of grave and VC medal (Leicestershire)

British recipients of the Victoria Cross
67th Regiment of Foot officers
1840 births
1920 deaths
Burials in Leicestershire
Military personnel from Hampshire
British Army personnel of the Second Opium War
Companions of the Order of the Bath
People from Basingstoke and Deane
British military personnel of the Second Anglo-Afghan War
8th King's Royal Irish Hussars officers
Prince of Wales's Leinster Regiment officers
British Army recipients of the Victoria Cross